Gundadalur is the name of an area in Tórshavn, Faroe Islands. It is home to three different football pitches and other sports facilities. The largest one is the national stadium Tórsvøllur, a multi-use stadium.

Overview
The actual Gundadalur Stadium is located just alongside Tórsvøllur. It was opened in 1911. There are two sports halls in the same area. Høllin á Hálsi is the oldest one; built in 1970, it is located just above Tórsvøllur. The sports hall has been owned by Tórshavn Municipality since 2004. Gundadalshøllin is the other sports hall, lying below and south of Høllin á Hálsi. Both sports halls are mainly used for handball and volleyball, but also for other public events, not related to sports. Gundadalshøllin is owned by the handball clubs Neistin and Kyndil, and the volleyball club Fleyr. There is also a swimming hall in Gundadalur that was built in 1984. It has one swimming pool which is 25 meters long with six lanes, and it has three other pools: one deep, and two not-so-deep pools which are mainly for children. There is a gymnastics venue inside a hall at the north-eastern side of Tórsvøllur; it is called Fimi and is owned by Tórshavn Municipality. Outside the western corner of the Gundadalur Stadium is a sportshall for badminton, it is called Badmintonhøllin. North of the badminton hall is a tennis venue. Just outside the valley of Gundadalur is a venue for athletics, named Tórsbreyt.

Ovari vøllur
The Upper Field (Ovari vøllur) is the main field used for first level matches and is the home ground of HB and B36. It can also host the matches of other Faroese teams in the European competitions.

Niðari vøllur
The Lower Field (Niðari vøllur), is mostly used for training and also lower level matches. Is the home ground of Giza/Hoyvík and Undrið FF.

References

External links
Torsvollur.fo - Official Homepage
Gundadalur stadium photos and video - Nordic Stadiums
Tórsvøllur stadium photos and video - Nordic Stadiums

Sport in Tórshavn
Football venues in the Faroe Islands
Sports venues in the Faroe Islands
B36 Tórshavn
Havnar Bóltfelag
Sports venues completed in 1911